Krasnoyarsky District is an administrative and municipal district (raion), one of the twenty-seven in Samara Oblast, Russia. It is located in the northern central part of the oblast. Its administrative center is the rural locality (a selo) of Krasny Yar. Population: 54,497 (2010 Census);  The population of Krasny Yar accounts for 14.6% of the district's total population.

References

Notes

Sources

Districts of Samara Oblast